Beatrice of Castile (5 November or 6 December 1254 – 1286) was a daughter of Alfonso X of Castile and his wife Violant of Aragon. She was Marchioness of Montferrat by her marriage and was mother of Irene of Montferrat.

Family 
Beatrice was the second of eleven children, her siblings included Sancho IV of Castile and Ferdinand de la Cerda, Infante of Castile. Of the eleven children, only six had their own children, this included Beatrice. She was a member of the Castilian House of Burgundy.

Beatrice's maternal grandparents were James I of Aragon and his second wife Violant of Hungary, herself daughter of Andrew II of Hungary and Yolanda de Courtenay.

Beatrice's paternal grandparents were Ferdinand III of Castile and Elisabeth of Hohenstaufen, herself daughter of Philip of Swabia and Irene Angelina.

Life 
Beatrice was originally betrothed to John II, Margrave of Brandenburg. Her betrothal was arranged by her father to attract the support of Brandenburg for his candidacy for the throne of Germany. Although the name of the king's daughter is not specified in the source, it could only have been Beatrice as her older sister Berenguela was already betrothed at that date. The engagement was however broken off.

Beatrice married in Murcia in August 1271 to William VII, Marquess of Montferrat. He had been married twice already but only had a daughter Margaret, who married Beatrice's brother John. Beatrice and William had the following children:
a son (1272–1273), died young
a son (1272–1273), died young and twin of previous
Yolande (1274–1317), married Andronikos II Palaiologos and had issue
John I ( 1275–1305), succeeded his father as Marquess
Alessina (died before 1305), married Poncello Orsini

Beatrice died in 1286, her husband died six years later. Of her five children, three lived to adulthood.

Ancestry

References

1254 births
1286 deaths
Castilian infantas
Castilian House of Burgundy
Marchionesses of Montferrat
13th-century Spanish women
13th-century Castilians
13th-century Italian women
13th-century Italian nobility
Daughters of kings